Tantan Dzalikha (born 6 August 1982) is an Indonesian professional footballer who played as a forward.

Career
Tantan joined Sriwijaya from Persitara Batavia Union at the start of the 2013 season. On 1 March 2013 he scored a hat-trick in a 4–3 win against Gresik United.

International career
Tantan won his first cap for Indonesia in a friendly match against Kyrgyzstan on 1 November 2013, where he played as a substitute in a 4-0 win.

National team

Honours

Club
Persibo Bojonegoro
 Second Division: 2004
Sriwijaya FC
 Indonesian Inter Island Cup: 2012
Persib Bandung
 Indonesia Super League: 2014
 Indonesia President's Cup: 2015

References

External links
 
 Tantan Profile on Eyesoccer Football Database

1982 births
Living people
Sundanese people
Association football forwards
Indonesian footballers
Liga 1 (Indonesia) players
Persikab Bandung players
Persibo Bojonegoro players
Persitara Jakarta Utara players
Sriwijaya F.C. players
Persib Bandung players
Sportspeople from West Java
Indonesian Super League-winning players